Microsynanthedon is a genus of moths in the family Sesiidae.

Species
Microsynanthedon ambrensis Viette, [1955]
Microsynanthedon setodiformis (Mabille, 1891)
Microsynanthedon tanala Minet, 1976

References

Sesiidae